Atuna excelsa is a species of flowering plant in the family Chrysobalanaceae, native to Thailand to the western Pacific.

Taxonomy
Atuna excelsa was first described by William Jack in 1822 as Petrocarya excelsa. The species and its two subspecies have acquired a large number of synonyms.

Subspecies
, Plants of the World Online accepted two subspecies:
Atuna excelsa subsp. excelsa – Malesia and New Guinea
Atuna excelsa subsp. racemosa (Raf.) Prance – throughout most of the distribution of the species; introduced to Java

Distribution
Atuna excelsa is native to Thailand, Malesia (Borneo, Java, Peninsular Malaysia, the Maluku Islands, the Philippines, Sulawesi and Sumatra), Papuasia (the Bismarck Archipelago, New Guinea and the Solomon Islands) and the western Pacific (the Caroline Islands, Fiji, Samoa, the Santa Cruz Islands, Tonga, Vanuatu and Wallis and Futuna).

References

excelsa
Flora of the Bismarck Archipelago
Flora of Borneo
Flora of the Caroline Islands
Flora of Fiji
Flora of Java
Flora of Malaya
Flora of the Maluku Islands
Flora of New Guinea
Flora of the Philippines
Flora of Samoa
Flora of the Santa Cruz Islands
Flora of the Solomon Islands (archipelago)
Flora of Sulawesi
Flora of Sumatra
Flora of Thailand
Flora of Tonga
Flora of Vanuatu
Flora of Wallis and Futuna
Plants described in 1822